Kosmos 903 ( meaning Cosmos 903) was a Soviet US-K missile early warning satellite which was launched in 1977 as part of the Soviet military's Oko programme. The satellite was designed to identify missile launches using optical telescopes and infrared sensors.

Kosmos 903 was launched from Site 43/3 at Plesetsk Cosmodrome in the Russian SSR. A Molniya-M carrier rocket with a 2BL upper stage was used to perform the launch, which took place at 01:38 UTC on 11 April 1977. The launch successfully placed the satellite into a molniya orbit. It subsequently received its Kosmos designation, and the international designator 1977-027A. The United States Space Command assigned it the Satellite Catalog Number 9911.

It was reported in History and the Current Status of the Russian Early-Warning System, that it self-destructed.

It re-entered in August 2014.

See also

List of Kosmos satellites (751–1000)
List of R-7 launches (1975–1979)
1977 in spaceflight
List of Oko satellites

References

Kosmos satellites
1977 in spaceflight
Oko
Spacecraft launched by Molniya-M rockets
Spacecraft launched in 1977
Spacecraft which reentered in 2014